The Thumb Area Underwater Preserve is a preservation area in Lake Huron in the U.S. state of Michigan.

Description
The Thumb Area Underwater Preserve protects bottomlands off Pointe aux Barques and the beach port towns of Harbor Beach, Huron City, and Port Austin.  The Michigan Department of Environmental Quality has counted 10 known shipwrecks within the boundaries protected by the preserve.  

As in most of the Great Lakes, most of the shipwrecks predate the consolidation of federal marine safety services into the United States Coast Guard in 1915.

The foundered SS Daniel J. Morrell, a lake freighter which split in two and sank in 1966 with a loss of 28 lives, also lies off the shore of Michigan's Thumb, but outside the boundaries of the Underwater Preserve.

The Underwater Preserve protects a network of limestone sea caves off Port Austin.  Near Port Austin is the largely depopulated former town of Grindstone City, where grindstones were quarried.  Some of the specialized stones were lost overboard near the quarries and can be seen underwater as of 2009.

References

External links
 Thumb Area Bottomland Preserve Michigan Underwater Preserve Council

Protected areas of Huron County, Michigan
Marine parks of Michigan
Shipwreck discoveries by John Steele
Lake Huron